George Donne (1605–1639), a bit player in the establishment of Virginia, is described by historian Brent Tarter as, "the less talented son of the clergyman and poet John Donne."  He is chiefly remembered for his 1638 pamphlet, Virginia Reviewed, a plan to reform the government of the Virginia colony.

Military career
Donne served as a captain and sergeant-major in the memorably unsuccessful British Siege of Saint-Martin-de-Ré (1627).  He next served as military commander of the English colony planted on St. Kitts.  When Spain conquered the colony in 1629, Donne negotiated a surrender under which the English settlers would return to England in ships that the Spanish Admiral Fadrique de Toledo Osorio had captured and held as prizes of war, with Donne held as hostage against the return of the ships to Spain.  In the event, the ships were not returned to Spain and Donne was imprisoned at Cadiz for several years.  In 1633 he somehow escaped and returned to England.

Virginia
Donne was sent to Virginia in 1637 as Muster-Master General, Marshall of Virginia.  He arrived early in 1637 and became a member of the Council of Royal Governor, John Harvey.  Harvey, who was opposed by Virginia's increasingly powerful tobacco magnates, sent Donne to England in 1638 to argue in his defense at Court.  While in England Donne wrote Virginia Reviewed.  Harvey was removed from office, but Donne retained his appointments.  He died aboard ship while returning to Virginia in 1639.

References

Virginia colonial people
1639 deaths
1605 births
17th-century English military personnel
People who died at sea
English pamphleteers